Francesco Mancini (10 October 1968 – 30 March 2012) was an Italian football goalkeeper and coach, best known for his association with Foggia during the 1990s.

Football career

Early career
Mancini started his career at hometown club Matera in 1985. He later played for Bisceglie in 1987.

Foggia
Mancini joined Foggia in 1987 and remained with the club for a decade. He helped the club achieve Serie A promotion under manager Zdeněk Zeman, winning the 1990–91 Serie B title.

He played 2 Serie B games for Foggia in the 1995–96 season, before leaving on loan for S.S. Lazio in November 1995.

He returned to Foggia in the summer of 1996 and played another Serie B season with the club.

Bari
In summer 1997, he joined A.S. Bari of Serie A, where he played 95 games in three Serie A seasons.

Napoli
In October 2000, he transferred to S.S.C. Napoli of Serie A, to replace young keeper Ferdinando Coppola who had been sold to Bologna. His first choice place was lost to new signing Alberto Fontana in January 2001, however. He regained his first choice spot following Napoli's relegation to Serie B. In the 2002–03 season, despite the presence of backup goalkeeper Marco Storari and subsequently Emanuele Manitta, he still made 27 appearances at age of 35.

Late career
In summer 2003, he joined Pisa of Serie C1 as Napoli choose to sign Manitta permanently.

In January 2005, he transferred to Sambenedettese of Serie C1, in exchange for Domenico Di Dio.

He then played for Teramo, Salernitana and A.C. Martina, all in Serie C1.

Post-playing career
During the 2009–10 season, he worked as the goalkeeping coach and the assistant coach of Manfredonia, who were playing in the Lega Pro Seconda Divisione league.

In July 2010 he was appointed the new goalkeeping coach of his former club Foggia, where he worked as part of the backroom staff of his mentor Zdeněk Zeman. Later on, in July 2011, he followed Zeman to Serie B club Pescara.

Death
On 30 March 2012, 43-year-old Mancini was found dead at his Pescara home by his wife after suffering a sudden heart attack.

Honours
Foggia
Serie B champions: 1990–91

References

External links
2005-06 Profile at footballplus

1968 births
2012 deaths
Italian footballers
F.C. Matera players
Calcio Foggia 1920 players
S.S. Lazio players
S.S.C. Bari players
S.S.C. Napoli players
Pisa S.C. players
U.S. Salernitana 1919 players
A.S.D. Martina Calcio 1947 players
A.S. Sambenedettese players
Serie A players
Serie B players
Association football goalkeepers
People from Matera
Sportspeople from the Province of Matera
A.S. Bisceglie Calcio 1913 players
Footballers from Calabria